Haroon Al Rashid (Urdu:پیر ہارون الرشید) (born 1935) is the leader of the Nisbat-e-Rasooli Sufi order in Mohra Sharif, Pakistan , and is known by the honorific Pir. He gives Islamic sermons every Friday (in Mohra Sharif) and Saturday (in Islamabad). He preaches the philosophy of Nisbat-e-Rasooli.

Al-Rashid has performed the Hajj pilgrimage every year since 1960, and has over six million followers around the world.

He has two sons, Alhaj Pir Dr. Gohar Nazir and Shahzada Jamal Nazir, and two daughters. Pir Gohar Nazir is the current leader or the gadi nasheen of Mohra Sharif. He has two sons, Deedawar Nazir and Murad Nazir, who are currently studying. Pir Gohar Nazir is a doctor by education and profession. He built a free hospital in Mohra Sharif, where he sees patients daily. He wrote his first book "Arzo e Natamam" when he was in eighth grade in Aitchison College Lahore. After that he wrote two more books: Kayal Rang and Rang e Ja'n. Both are in Urdu and contain Sufi Kalam (Naats) and gazals as well.

Shahzada Jamal Nazir is a former Federal Minister in the interim 2013 Cabinet. He was also a Member National Commission on Minorities, and Advisor with Minister of State status for the Government of Pakistan on National Regulations and Services. He has a J.D. (Juris Doctor) and LL.M. from the Strum College of Law, University of Denver, USA.

References
 Sufi Muhammad Rasheed (2006). Nisbat-e-Rasooli.  Maktaba Nisbat-e-Rasooli.
 http://www.mohrasharif.com.pk
 https://web.archive.org/web/20100130141901/http://www.nisbat-e-rasooli.info/

1935 births
Living people
Pakistani Sufis
Pakistani Sufi religious leaders
People from Rawalpindi District
Punjabi people